The Kaohsiung Medical University (KMU) is a private medical school located in Sanmin District, Kaohsiung, Taiwan.

History
The university was originally established as Kaohsiung Medical College in 1954 by the former mayor of Kaohsiung City, Chen Chi-chuan, and Tu Tsung-ming, the first Ph.D. of Medical Sciences in Taiwan. At the time of its establishment, the college was the first private institution of its kind in southern Taiwan.

The college hospital, the Chung-Ho Memorial Hospital, was founded three years after the establishment of KMC in June 1957. Chung-Ho Memorial Hospital is the largest medical center in southern Taiwan and serves as a teaching hospital. In 1998, KMC, in agreement with the Kaohsiung Municipal Government, acquired an additional teaching hospital, the Hsiao-kang Hospital.

The Kaohsiung Medical College was re-shaped into the Kaohsiung Medical University (KMU) in August 1999 with the permission of the Ministry of Education, Taiwan.

KMU was rated "superior" by the Ministry of Education, Taiwan in all categories of the "Mid-term School Administration Development Plan."

Teaching
As of October 2013, KMU has a student-faculty ratio of 13.1:1. The university offers 6 bachelor's, 10 master's and 5 doctoral degree programs.

Up to NT$35 million of scholarships and student grants are offered each year. KMU is the only medical academic institution offering graduate-entry medical programs in Taiwan (the Faculty of Post-Bachelor's degree of Medicine), an admission system based on North American medical institutes.

Research

KMU is associated with eleven major research centers and networks, and is engaged in research partnerships with other universities, government and industry in Taiwan and other countries.

 The MedicoGenomic Research Center of Kaohsiung Medical University has successfully developed colorectal cancer diagnostic chip  and determined molecular markers for tumors (including DNA and RNA markers) which can be used in the laboratory or clinical tests.
 The Functional Proteomics Research Center is performing systematic research on cellular proteins' types, functions, differences in expression, and modification after translation.
 The Chinese Herbal Medicine and New Drug Research Center is devising new drug models for herbal medicines and developing herbal prescriptions that meet international standards.

Post-Baccalaureate/Bachelor Degree of Medicine

Established in the spring of 1983, the program enrols applicants with recognized undergraduate/bachelor's degrees. Admission into the program is based solely on the two-staged PBD Medicine Entrance Examination (consisting of a written exam and an interview), which takes place annually in June. Subjects of written examination include English, Biology and Organic Chemistry. Enrolment into the program is highly competitive with admission rate in 2011 approximately 4.3%. The faculty currently enrols 261 students.

Post-Bachelor's degree of Medicine is a five-year program. The program consists of two-year pre-clerkship (77 credits), two-year clerkship, and one-year internship. Pre-clerkship consists of 16 integrated blocks and problem-based learning (PBL). Individual and population health, ethical practices, and related issues are integrated into and emphasized, where appropriate, in all phases of the pre-clerkship. Each block consists of two semesters each with at least one mid-term written examination and ends with a final examination that concludes each semester of a block.

Departments

College of Medicine
 School of Medicine
 School of Medicine for Post-Baccalaureate/Post-Bachelor's degree of Medicine
 School of Sports Medicine
 School of Respiratory Care
 School of Renal Care
 Graduate Institute of Medicine
 Graduate Institute of Biochemistry
 Graduate Institute of Pharmacology
 Graduate Institute of Medical Genetics
 Graduate Institute of Physiology and Molecular Medicine

College of Dentistry
 School of Dentistry
 School of Dental Hygiene
 Graduate Institute of Dental Sciences
 Graduate Institute of Oral Health Sciences

College of Pharmacy
 School of Pharmacy
 School of Fragrance and Cosmetics
 Graduate Institute of Pharmaceutical Sciences
 Graduate Institute of Natural Products
 Graduate Institute of Clinical Pharmacy

College of Nursing
 School of Nursing
 Graduate Institute of Nursing
 Graduate Institute of Gender Studies

College of Health Science
 School of Public Health
 Graduate Institute of Public Health
 Graduate Institute of Occupational Safety and Health
 School of Medical Sociology and Social Work
 School of Psychology
 Graduate Institute of Behavioral Sciences
 School of Biomedical Laboratory Science
 School of Occupational Therapy
 School of Physical Therapy
 School of Medical Radiology
 School of Medical Information Management

College of Life Sciences
 School of Medical and Applied Chemistry
 School of Biomedical Science and Environmental Biology
 Department of Biotechnology

Notable alumni
 Kwan Aij-lie,  neurosurgeon, and President of the International College of Surgeons
 Huang Chao-shun, former member of Legislative Yuan
 Tei-Fu Chen, founder and chairman of Sunrider
 Oi-Lin Chen, president of Sunrider

See also
 List of universities in Taiwan

References

External links

 KMU webpage
 Chung-Ho Memorial Hospital Webpage
 SCOPE KMU webpage

 
1954 establishments in Taiwan
Educational institutions established in 1954
Scientific organizations based in Taiwan
Universities and colleges in Taiwan
Universities and colleges in Taipei
Technical universities and colleges in Taiwan